Football is the most popular sport in Nigeria. The Nigeria national football team competes regularly for international titles and many Nigerian footballers compete in Europe, particularly in England. Nigeria has one of the finest national teams in Africa and has produced many notable footballers including Mudashiru Lawal, Rashidi Yekini, Jay Jay Okocha, Nwankwo Kanu, Vincent Enyeama, Joseph Yobo and Mikel John Obi.

History
Football was first introduced to Nigeria by the British at the start of the twentieth century. The first recorded football match in Nigeria was in 1904. By 1950, football had become the national game of the country. During this time in African history, many nations began to partake in nationalist movements where they protested colonial power. In Nigeria, football gave citizens a sense of national pride and inspired them to achieve political freedom. An individual named Nnamdi Azikiwe played a critical role in helping Nigeria achieve its freedom from Britain.

Peter Alegi, associate professor of history at Michigan State University, states, "Nnamdi Azikiwe emerged as a key figure connecting sports and politics in the late colonial period" (37). Throughout his life, Azikiwe was angered by the racism and racial segregation that existed in sports. There were two particular events in his life that motivated him to finally take action. The first event was when "he was denied the opportunity to compete in a track-and-field event at the 1934 Empire Games because Nigeria was not allowed to participate" (Alegi 39). The second event was when his application to join a tennis club in Lagos was rejected because of his Igbo background. These events resulted in Azikiwe creating the Zik's Athletic Club (ZAC) in Lagos in April 1938. This sports club had facilities and equipment for many sports such as football, boxing, and tennis. The club quickly became a symbol of African self-determination and nationalism in Nigeria.

Throughout the course of World War II, Azikiwe continuously criticized the British for fighting in a war for democracy, yet at the same time, oppress Africans from self-determination. To spread his ideas and popularize the game of football, Azikiwe went on numerous tours across Nigeria during the war. He also established a nationalist newspaper, the West African Pilot, in 1937. This newspaper popularized the game of football in Nigeria and made it a crucial aspect of the nation's identity. It helped establish a greater sense of community within Nigeria and developed pan-African sentiments. The paper also played a critical role in raising attention about social consciousness. Through its coverage of football, the Pilot was able to achieve its mission. By the end of the war, football had become a cornerstone of Nigeria's identity. On October 1, 1960, Nigeria finally gained its independence from Britain. This year also saw Nigeria become a member of FIFA. Naamdi Azikiwe went on to become the first President of Nigeria in 1963.

National competitions

National team

The Nigeria national football team, nicknamed the Super Eagles, is the national team of Nigeria and is controlled by the Nigeria Football Association. According to the FIFA World Rankings, Nigeria, at 39th, are currently the 5th best team in the Confederation of African Football.

The Nigeria national football team played their first international match against Sierra Leone in Freetown on 8 October 1949. Nigeria won 2–0. Their biggest win recorded was 16–1 against Benin.

Nigeria's best performances at the World Cup are the 1994,  1998, and 2014 where they reached the second round.

Youth

Nigeria's youth  teams won the inaugural FIFA U-17 World Cup in 1985 as well as in 1993, 2007, 2013, 2015. The under-17 team is known as the Golden Eaglets and Under-20 team is known as the "Flying Eagles".

Nigeria's Flying Eagles qualified for the first time to represent Africa in the 1983 FIFA World Youth Championship in Mexico. Although Nigeria did not go beyond the first round, they beat the highly rated USSR 1-0 and held the Netherlands to a goalless draw.

In 1985, the under-17 football team went to China and conquered the world in the first ever FIFA U-17 World Championship. The victory took Nigerian youth football to a high pedestal, setting the stage for a respect of Nigeria in international competitions. The under-20 team went to Saudi Arabia for the 1989 FIFA World Youth Championship and lost narrowly in the final to Portugal. The team pulled off the now-legendary "Miracle of Damman", erasing a 4–0 deficit to the Soviet Union to tie and then win the match by penalties.
In 2007, the under-17 squad were crowned world champions in South Korea for the 3rd time. Nigeria hosted the 1999 FIFA World Youth Championship and the 2009 FIFA U-17 World Cup.

U-23

The 1996 under-23 team won the gold medal in the 1996 Summer Olympics held in Atlanta. After defeating Brazil by 4–3 in the semi-final, they won the final against Argentina 3–2.

Nigeria also won the first-ever Unity World Cup in 2014.

Women's football

The women's national team (the Super Falcons) has been a dominant force on the African continent since its inception. They have qualified for every FIFA Women's World Cup and won the first seven CAF Women's Championships before having their run end in 2008 against Equatorial Guinea. Great players for the Falcons include Mercy Akide, Maureen Mmadu and Perpetua Nkwocha.

+30,000 capacity Nigerian football stadiums

See also
 Nigeria national football team
 Nigeria women's national football team
 Nigeria Football Association
 Nigerian Premier League
 Women's football in Nigeria

Bibliography

References